Ute is a German feminine given name.

People with the name include:
Ute Berg (born 1953), German politician and member of the SPD
Ute Christensen (born 1955), German actress
Ute Enzenauer (born 1965), West German road racing cyclist
Ute Frevert (born 1954), professor of German history at Yale
Ute Geweniger (born 1964), East German breaststroke and medley swimmer
Ute Hommola (born 1952), German track and field athlete 
Ute Lemper (born 1963), German chanteuse and actress
Ute Noack, East German cross country skier
Ute Steppin (born 1965), German volleyball player
Ute Thimm née Finger (born 1958), German track and field athlete 
Ute Vogt (born 1964), German politician 
Ute Wartenberg (born 1963), scholar and numismatist 
Ute Wetzig (born 1971), German diver

German feminine given names